The 1988 South American U-16 Championship was an international association football tournament held in Ecuador. The ten national teams involved in the tournament were required to register a squad; only players in these squads were eligible to take part in the tournament.Each player had to have been born after 1 January 1972.

Group A

Argentina

Colombia

Uruguay
Head coach:  Isabelino Barrios

Peru

Bolivia

Group B

Brazil
Head coach:  Renê Rodrigues Simões

Paraguay

Chile
Head coach:  Mario Burgos

partidosdelaroja.com/1970/01/nominas-de-chile-para-sudamericanos-sub17.html

Ecuador

Venezuela

References

South American Under-17 Football Championship squads